Events from the year 1590 in India.

Events
 Ibrahim Adil Shah II becomes king of Bijapur Sultanate, following the death of Ali Adil Shah I
 Muhammad Quli Qutb Shah becomes  fifth sultan of the Qutb Shahi dynasty (and reigns until 1611)

Births

Deaths
 Ali Adil Shah I, Bijapur Sultanate
 Ibrahim Quli Qutb Shah Wali, ruler of Golkonda died (born 1518)

See also
 Timeline of Indian history

References 

 
India
16th century in India